In human population genetics, Native American ancestry refers to genetic ancestry being traced to a relationship back to one or more individuals who were Indigenous to the Americas. Tests cannot pinpoint specific Native American tribes, nor can tests determine whether someone is Native American or not.

Genetically, Native Americans are most closely related to East Asians and Ancient North Eurasian. Native American genomes contain genetic signals from Western Eurasia due in part to their descent from a common Siberian population during the Upper Paleolithic period.

In the United States, levels of what commercial DNA companies mark as Indigenous American ancestry (distinct from Native American identity, which is based on kinship, citizenship, and cultural ties) among non-Natives differ, but in general are extremely low. The genomes of self-reported African Americans averaged to 0.8% Native American ancestry, those of European Americans averaged  0.18%, and those of Latinos averaged 18.0%.

Geneticist Kim TallBear (Dakota), author of Native American DNA: Tribal Belonging and the False Promise of Genetic Science, has written about individuals discovering what they believe to be Native American ancestry through DNA testing, who then self-identify as Native American in general, or as members or descendants of a specific tribe. She notes, however, that not only is there no DNA test that can indicate a tribe, but "There is no DNA-test to prove you're Native American". and that this group mostly continues to identify as white. She also stresses that Indigenous identity is not about one distant (and possibly nonexistent) ancestor, but rather political citizenship, culture, kinship, and daily, lived experience as part of an Indigenous community. 

Hispanic families in Latin America may be of Native American, European, African, or Asian ancestry; many Latin Americans descend from two or more of these ancestral populations. However, a Hispanic or Latino person with Native ancestry is not necessarily considered Indigenous if they do not have a cultural or familial connection to a Native nation.

See also
 Cherokee descent
 Índia pega no laço
 Indigenous peoples in Canada
 Native Americans in the United States
 Native American name controversy
 Pretendian
 Genetic history of Indigenous peoples of the Americas

References

Genetic genealogy
American genealogy
Multiracial affairs in the United States
Native American history
Demographic history of the United States